Citizenship education is taught in schools, as an academic subject similar to politics or sociology. It is known by different names in different countries - for example, ‘citizenship education’ (or just ‘citizenship’ for short) in the UK, ‘civics’ in the US, and ‘education for democratic citizenship’ in parts of Europe.  The different names for the subject is mirrored in the different approaches towards citizenship education adopted in different countries.  These are often a consequence of the unique historical and political developments within different countries.

In many countries, the focus of the teaching is on active citizenship. The purpose of "active citizenship" is to teach students to work together and take practical action, using their citizenship knowledge and understanding to contribute to a better society. For example, after learning about human rights, diversity and inequality, students might decide to set up a project to address racism in their school or local community. Other examples of active citizenship projects include starting recycling programmes, setting up student action groups to address bullying or promote fair trade or campaigning to lower the voting age to 16.

Countries

England 
Citizenship education has been a statutory subject in the English National Curriculum since 2001. It must be taught as part of the school curriculum to all pupils aged 11–16 years old in maintained schools in England. The current Programme of Study was introduced in 2014, and identifies four key areas in detail:

 Politics: Parliamentary democracy in the UK; Parliament, voting, elections, political parties; Influence of citizens through democratic processes; Other systems of government beyond the UK; UK relations with Europe, Commonwealth, wider world.
 Financial Skills: The functions and uses of money; Personal budgeting, money management; Wages, taxes, credit, debt, financial risk, financial products and services

 Volunteering: The ways a citizen can contribute to the improvement of their community; Opportunity to participate actively in community volunteering
 Law: The precious liberties enjoyed by citizens of the UK; Nature of rules and laws, criminal and civil law; The justice system; Diversity in the UK – need for mutual respect and understanding

History 

Citizenship Education was introduced as a statutory subject in the English National Curriculum in 2001 following the recommendation of the Crick Report in 1998. This report, which had been commissioned by the New Labour government following its election victory in 1997, called for “no less than a change in the political culture of this country both nationally and locally: for people to think of themselves as active citizens, willing, able and equipped to have an influence in public life and with the critical capacities to weigh evidence before speaking and acting.”   The report went on the recommend ‘that citizenship and the teaching of democracy…is so important both for schools and the life of the nation that there must be a statutory requirement on schools to ensure that is it part of the entitlement of all pupils’  Prior to this, since 1990, there had existed a Cross Curricular Theme, ‘Education for Citizenship’ (CG8).

At the same time as the subject was introduced in 2001, a Longitudinal Study, run by the NfER, began. This studied the impacts of the teaching of citizenship over a 10-year timeframe.  The Citizenship Education curriculum was revised in 2007/8 to focus on the ‘Key Concepts’ of Democracy and Justice, Rights and Responsibilities, and Identities and Diversity (Living together in the UK); and the ‘Key Processes’ of Critical thinking and enquiry, Advocacy and representation, and Informed and responsible action.  This version of the curriculum in particular was concerned with the practical side of citizenship - going beyond just the knowledge of institutions.  

After the 2010 General Election, with the election of a new Coalition Government, the Government launched a review of the National Curriculum, including the Citizenship subject. Despite early fears that the subject would be removed from the National Curriculum altogether, it was retained.  However, a revised content was published which was considerably scaled back and re-focused on knowledge rather than skills and practice. Much of the central support for the subject, such as teacher training, was removed.

Current situation 

In 2018, the House of Lords published The Ties That Bind: Citizenship and Civic Engagement in the 21st Century which was highly critical of the state of citizenship education in English schools, which had been allowed to 'degrade to a parlous state' (para 162). It called for a statutory entitlement to citizenship education from primary to the end of secondary education, which should be inspected by Ofsted and should be taken into consideration when Ofsted is deciding whether a school should be rated as outstanding.  It also calls for Ofsted to undertake a review of the current provision and quality of citizenship education in schools and highlight best practice.  Other recommendations include:

 The Government should establish a target of having enough trained citizenship teachers to have a citizenship specialist in every secondary school (para 132).
 The Government should establish citizenship education as a priority subject for teacher training, and provide bursaries for applicants. Urgent action should be taken to step up programmes of Continuing Professional Development for those willing to take on and lead citizenship education in their school (para 133).
 The Government should ensure that the National College for Teaching and Leadership allows citizenship teachers to apply to be specialist leaders of education (para 135)
 Ofsted should undertake a review of the current provision and quality of citizenship education in schools and highlight best practice. This should be followed up with long term monitoring of whether citizenship education achieves the set of criteria or goals that the Government sets out for it (para 143).
 The Government should work with exam boards to ensure that citizenship qualifications feature active citizenship projects as a substantial part of the qualification (para 148).
 The Government should conduct a review of the citizenship curriculum and formulate a new curriculum that includes the Shared Values of British Citizenship, the NCS and active citizenship projects. Piecemeal changes made without reference to the existing curriculum should be avoided (para 161).

The ‘academisation’ of the education system in England has had a dramatic impact on the teaching of citizenship.  Academies do not need to follow the National Curriculum, and as more than half of all English schools (¾ of secondary schools) are now academies, this has undermined the teaching of citizenship as a discrete subject.  School attainment has been focused on a small number of core subjects, leading to less importance being placed on other subjects such as art, drama, music, and citizenship education.  There is also a greater emphasis on exam results rather than coursework, which has discouraged more experiential learning.  As a consequence, few secondary schools now have qualified citizenship teachers, and few maintain the subject as a discrete subject in its own right.

More encouragingly for the subject, in 2019 Ofsted published its new inspection framework, which was more positive for citizenship - schools would in future be graded taking into account a more balanced curriculum, including citizenship.

A GCSE in "Citizenship Studies" is available for students in key stage 4. The three main awarding bodies in England (AQA, OCR and Edexcel) offer this qualification as a full and a short course. The qualification includes a controlled assessment based on an active citizenship project they have taken part in. There is also an A level in Citizenship Studies which is available through AQA. This qualification is valued by leading Universities including the University of Cambridge. More than 500,000 young people have now attained qualifications in Citizenship Studies since 2002.

Ireland 
Citizenship studies was introduced as a compulsory subject in the 1990s in Ireland. It is known as CSPE (Civic, Social and Political Education) and is taught to 12- to 16-year-olds. In 2009 it is expected that an additional subject currently under the working title 'Society and Politics' will be offered as a subject to students between 16–18 years of age in secondary schools in the Republic of Ireland.

France 
In France citizenship education is known as ECJS (education civique, juridique et sociale) in the high school and  "éducation civique"  in the middle school and primary school.

As a response to the terror attacks in Paris on 7–9 January 2015, France announced a new plan to reintegrate citizenship into the French educational system. The plan seeks to restore authority to teachers, reinforce the values of the Republic, and promote community values and service. It includes training for teachers, a yearly charter to be signed by both student and guardian, community service assignments for student misbehavior, and a day of laïcité, or secularism, yearly on 9 December.

Poland 
In Poland, citizenship is known as WoS ("Wiedza o Społeczeństwie", literally "Knowledge of Society") and studied as one of the matura subjects.

Finland 
In Finland citizenship education is known as YH, YT or YO. (yhteiskuntaoppi)

Norway 
In Norway citizenship education is the primary mandate of Social Studies.

Sweden 
In Sweden citizenship education is mainly focused in the subject of Social Studies - Samhällskunskap, but also in Consumer Economics within the subject of Hem- och konsumentkunskap which is most closely related to Home Economics.

Indonesia 
Citizenship education in Indonesia is nationally designed and implemented.

China 
There is a curious kind of citizenship education in China which could be called "peopleship" education.

Honduras 
In Honduras, to graduate from 6th grade, students are required to pass the "Anthem Test". This test aims to measure students' understanding of the country's history  as well as the flag and coat of arms.

Criticism of citizenship education in schools
There are two kinds of criticism of citizenship education in schools. Firstly, some philosophers of education argue that most governments and mainstream policies stimulate and advocate questionable approaches of citizenship education. These approaches aim to develop specific dispositions in students, dispositions conducive to political participation and solidarity. But there are radically different views on the nature of good citizenship and education should involve and develop autonomy and open-mindedness. Therefore, it requires a more critical approach than is possible when political participation and solidarity are conceived of as goals of education. Secondly, some educationalists argue that merely teaching children about the theory of citizenship is ineffective, unless schools themselves reflect democratic practices by giving children the opportunity to have a say in decision making. They suggests that schools are fundamentally undemocratic institutions, and that such a setting cannot instill in children the commitment and belief in democratic values that is necessary for citizenship education to have a proper impact. Some educationalists relate this criticism to John Dewey (but see critical comments on this interpretation of Dewey: Van der Ploeg, 2016).

Notable academics

Joel Westheimer, professor of citizenship education at the University of Ottawa

See also
 Civics
 Global citizenship education
 
 Spatial citizenship
 The Springfield Plan

References

External links

Citizenship education in schools
 Learn and Serve America's National Service-Learning Clearinghouse Citizenship Education Bibliography
 Time for Citizenship - a UK based Primary Education site
 Department for Children, schools and families Citizenship site
 QCDA Citizenship
 The Association for Citizenship Teaching
What is citizenship and why teach it?
Young Citizens
 Citized
Patriotism and Nationalism in Music Education (Ashgate press, 2012)
 Desh Apnayen - Citizenship Education Club in India
 Spatial Citizenship for Education
European Citizenship Education
 NECE - Networking European Citizenship Education

Educational programs
Education